West Beach may refer to:
Australia
West Beach, South Australia
West Beach, Western Australia

United States
West Beach (Santa Barbara), California
West Beach, Beverly, Massachusetts

South Africa
West Beach, Western Cape

See also
Westbeach, British TV series